Tazeh Kand (also Romanized as Tāzeh Kand; also known as Mokhtār Kandī, Qarah Tūlkī-ye Tāzehkand, and Qareh Tūlkī) is a village in Baba Jik Rural District, in the Central District of Chaldoran County, West Azerbaijan Province, Iran. At the 2006 census, its population was 20, in 6 families.

References 

Populated places in Chaldoran County